Mosharekat (meaning Participation) was a former pro-reform newspaper of the Islamic Iran Participation Front which was one of 13 reformist newspapers banned in Iran in April, 2000. The licence of the paper was owned by Mohammad Reza Khatami.

References

2000 disestablishments in Iran
Defunct newspapers published in Iran
Persian-language newspapers
Publications with year of establishment missing
Publications disestablished in 2000